The following is a list of national American television networks and announcers that have broadcast Kentucky Derby.

Television

2020s

2010s

In 2014, NBC renewed its broadcast agreement with Churchill Downs through 2025.

2000s

1990s

1980s

In 1985, a group of people wanted to increase the stature of the Triple Crown on television. Other than the Kentucky Derby, the Preakness Stakes and Belmont Stakes were considered the two "other" races. ABC Sports, which had broadcast the Derby since 1975, wanted to televise all the races as a three race package. CBS Sports, which showed the other two races, had much lower ratings for them, with the possible exceptions of years in which the Crown was at stake like 1973, 1977, and 1978.

1970s

1960s

1950s

On May 16, 1925, the first live radio broadcast of the Kentucky Derby was originated by WHAS and was also carried by WGN in Chicago. On May 7, 1949, the first television coverage of the Kentucky Derby took place, produced by WAVE-TV, the NBC affiliate in Louisville. This coverage was aired live in the Louisville market and sent to NBC as a kinescope newsreel recording for national broadcast. This broadcast was the first time Zoomar lenses were used on a broadcast TV sports show. On May 3, 1952, the first national television coverage of the Kentucky Derby took place, aired from then-CBS affiliate WHAS-TV. In 1954, the purse exceeded $100,000 for the first time.

See also

References

Lists of horse racing writers and broadcasters
ABC Sports
CBS Sports
NBC Sports
Kentucky Derby
American horse racing announcers
Wide World of Sports (American TV series)
CBS Sports Spectacular
Broadcasters